Sylvanus Marshall Apps (born August 1, 1947) is a Canadian former professional ice hockey centre who played 10 seasons in the National Hockey League for the New York Rangers, Los Angeles Kings and Pittsburgh Penguins. Apps was born in Toronto, Ontario. He was the son of Hockey Hall of Fame member Syl Apps.

Playing career
Apps played in the inaugural 1960 Quebec International Pee-Wee Hockey Tournament with the Scarboro Lions. He was originally drafted by the New York Rangers in 1964 but did not play his first big league season until 1970. That season, he was traded to the Pittsburgh Penguins, the team with which he made his mark, becoming one of the franchise's first stars. Between 1973 and 1976, Apps centered the Century Line with left wing Lowell MacDonald and right wing Jean Pronovost. He led the team in scoring three times and was named to play in the 1975 All-Star Game. Apps set a team record with 59 points in 1971–72, broke his own record in 1972–73 with 85 points, and tied that in 1973–74. Apps's best season was 1975–76, when he scored 32 goals and 67 assists for 99 points, although this was not a team record, as during this season Pierre Larouche scored 111 points and Jean Pronovost tallied 104.

With Apps's numbers declining, he was traded to the Los Angeles Kings in the 1977–78 season as the Penguins started to remake the team (Pierre Larouche, Dennis Owchar and Hartland Monahan were all dealt during this season. Dave Burrows and Jean Pronovost would be as well at the season's conclusion.) Apps retired two years later, finishing his career as the Penguins' career assist leader and second in goals and points. He played 727 career NHL games, scoring 183 goals and 423 assists for 606 points. He is the son of Hockey Hall of Famer Syl Apps.

Personal
Syl Apps Jr.'s son, Syl Apps III, was a hockey player in his own right, starring at Princeton University before spending four years in the minor leagues, retiring in 2003. His daughter, Gillian Apps, graduated from Dartmouth College in Hanover, New Hampshire, and majored in psychology. She played for the Dartmouth Big Green women's ice hockey program and was a top 10 finalist for the 2007 Patty Kazmaier Award. In addition, she was a two-time member of the Canadian Olympic team, and won gold medals in ice hockey at the 2006 Winter Olympics and ice hockey at the 2010 Winter Olympics. His oldest daughter, Amy Apps, was a member of the Canadian National women’s Soccer team and an OUA All Star in 1998 and 1999. His nephew, Darren Barber, won a gold medal in coxed eights at the 1992 Summer Olympics in Barcelona, as a member of the Canadian team. Barber also competed at the 1996 Summer Olympics in Atlanta, where he finished 4th.

Career statistics

Regular season and playoffs

Transactions
On June 11, 1964 the New York Rangers selected Syl Apps Jr. in the fourth-round (#21 overall) of the 1964 NHL draft.
On January 26, 1971 the New York Rangers traded Syl Apps Jr. and Sheldon Kannegiesser to the Pittsburgh Penguins in exchange for Glen Sather.
On November 2, 1977 the Pittsburgh Penguins traded Syl Apps Jr. and Hartland Monahan to the Los Angeles Kings in exchange for Dave Schultz, Gene Carr and a 1978 fourth-round pick (#61-Shane Pearsall).

See also
 Notable families in the NHL

References

External links

1947 births
Living people
Buffalo Bisons (AHL) players
Canadian ice hockey centres
Canadian people of English descent
Los Angeles Kings players
New York Rangers draft picks
New York Rangers players
Omaha Knights (CHL) players
Pittsburgh Penguins players
Princeton Tigers men's ice hockey players
Ice hockey people from Toronto